Lloyd Clifton Jeremy, Jr. (born December 13, 1989) is an Antiguan international footballer who currently plays for Antigua Barracuda FC in the USL Professional Division.

External links

1989 births
Living people
Antigua and Barbuda footballers
Antigua and Barbuda international footballers
Antigua Barracuda F.C. players
Association football forwards
USL Championship players